Hasanabad (also Romanized as Ḩasanābād) is a village in Rudbal Rural District, in the Central District of Marvdasht County, Fars Province, Iran. At the 2006 census, its population was 81, in 22 families.

References 

Populated places in Marvdasht County